Greatest Hits is a greatest hits album by British singer-songwriter Dido released in 2013. The album compiles all of Dido's singles since her first album No Angel (1999), through to her then latest studio album, Girl Who Got Away (2013). The two-disc collection was released on 22 November 2013 in Ireland, and includes a new track, "NYC", as well as a collection of remixes and collaborations. The track listing was confirmed on 9 October 2013.

Track listing
Credits adapted from the album's liner notes

Notes
 signifies a co-producer
 signifies a remixer
 signifies an additional producer

Chart performance

Certifications

Release history

References

2013 greatest hits albums
Dido (singer) compilation albums
RCA Records compilation albums
Albums produced by Rollo Armstrong